Jacobus Theodorus "Jacob" Abels (1803–1866) was a Dutch painter.

Life
Abels was born in Amsterdam in 1803. He was a pupil of the animal painter Jan van Ravenswaay. In 1826 Abels had visited Germany, and on his return settled at the Hague. His wife was the daughter of Pieter Os. Between 1849 and 1853 he lived in Haarlem and later he moved to Arnhem.

He was especially noted for his paintings of moonlit landscapes. The Museum at Haarlem has works painted by him.

Abels died at Abcoude on 11 June 1866.

References

Attribution:

External links 

 Jacobus Theodorus Abels artworks (paintings, watercolours, drawings), biography, information and signatures

1803 births
1866 deaths
Painters from Amsterdam
19th-century Dutch painters
Dutch male painters
19th-century Dutch male artists